Thomas Richard Redding (17 March 1932 – 1980) was an English professional footballer who played as a defender in the Football League for Grimsby Town.

References

1932 births
1980 deaths
Footballers from Grimsby
English footballers
Association football defenders
Brigg Town F.C. players
Grimsby Town F.C. players
Scarborough F.C. players
English Football League players